In mathematics, the dual q-Krawtchouk polynomials  are a family of basic hypergeometric orthogonal polynomials in the basic Askey scheme.  give a detailed list of their properties.

Definition

The  polynomials are given in terms of basic hypergeometric functions by 

where

References

Orthogonal polynomials
Q-analogs
Special hypergeometric functions